Estonia will be competing at the 2020 Summer Paralympics in Tokyo, Japan, from 24 August to 5 September 2021.

Athletics 

Estonia have secured one quota in athletics.
Men's field

Swimming 

Four Estonian swimmers has successfully earned Paralympic slots after breaking the Minimum Qualification Standard (MQS).
Men

Women

See also 
Estonia at the 2020 Summer Olympics
Estonia at the Paralympics

References 

Nations at the 2020 Summer Paralympics
2020
2021 in Estonian sport